The 2002 Women's Hockey World Cup was the 10th edition of the Women's Hockey World Cup field hockey tournament. It was held from 24 November to 8 December 2002 in Perth, Western Australia.

Argentina won the tournament for the first time after defeating the Netherlands 4–3 in the final on penalty strokes after a 1–1 draw. China won the third place match by defeating defending champions Australia 2–0 to claim their first ever World Cup medal.

For this tournament, the participating nations were increased from the standard 12 (as in the 6 previous editions) to 16.

Qualification
Each of the continental champions from five federations and the host nation received an automatic berth. The European federation received one extra quota based upon the FIH World Rankings. Spain and China qualified as 4th and 5th team in final ranking at the 2000 Summer Olympics, completing the final line-up alongside the six nations from the Qualifier.

After the United States could not attend the Qualifying Tournament due to the disruption of airline schedules after the September 11 attacks, the FIH organized a series of test-matches between that team and India (Seventh placed team in Qualifying Tournament) to ensure they had a chance to participate at the World Cup. The winner of the test-match series would qualify.

–Australia qualified both as host and continental champion, therefore that quota was given to the Oceania federation allowing New Zealand to qualify directly to the World Cup as the second placed team at the 2001 Oceania Cup.

Squads

Umpires
Below are the 18 umpires appointed by the International Hockey Federation:

Chieko Akiyama (JPN)
Michelle Arnold (AUS)
Julie Ashton-Lucy (AUS)
Judith Barnesby (AUS)
Renée Cohen (NED)
Ute Conen (GER)
Carolina de la Fuente (ARG)
Marelize de Klerk (RSA)
Jean Duncan (SCO)
Lynn Farrell (NZL)
Sarah Garnett (NZL)
Dawn Henning (ENG)
Soledad Iparraguirre (ARG)
Zang Jun Kentwell (USA)
Lee Mi-ok (KOR)
Mary Power (ENG)
Gina Spitaleri (ITA)
Kazuko Yasueda (JPN)

Results
All times are Western Standard Time (UTC+08:00)

First round

Pool A

Pool B

Thirteenth to sixteenth classification

Crossover

Fifteenth and sixteenth place

Thirteenth and fourteenth place

Ninth to twelfth place classification

Crossover

Eleventh and twelfth place

Ninth and tenth place

Fifth to eighth place classification

Crossover

Seventh and eighth place

Fifth and sixth place

First to fourth place classification

Semi-finals

Third and fourth place

Final

Awards

Statistics

Final standings

Goalscorers

References

External links
Official FIH website

 
2002
2002 in Australian women's sport
International women's field hockey competitions hosted by Australia
2002 in women's field hockey
Sports competitions in Perth, Western Australia
2000s in Perth, Western Australia